The Ties That Bind by Jude Watson is the fourteenth in a series of young reader novels called Jedi Apprentice. The series explores the adventures of Qui-Gon Jinn and Obi-Wan Kenobi prior to Star Wars: Episode I – The Phantom Menace.

Plot
Qui-Gon Jinn and his ally Tahl must go to New Apsolon to investigate a murder that can destroy the peace between the planet's upper and lower classes. Although he feels left out, Qui-Gon's apprentice, Obi-Wan Kenobi, also joins the group. The Jedi investigate, although they receive few leads. During the mission, Qui-Gon and Tahl pledge their love for each other.

However, Tahl is soon captured by the rogue faction that Qui-Gon and Obi-Wan were searching for. It is also learned that one of the heirs to the planet is in league with this faction. However, Qui-Gon and Obi-Wan are quickly focused on rescuing Tahl before she is killed.

References

External links

Amazon.com Listing
Official CargoBay Listing
TheForce.net review

2001 novels
2001 science fiction novels
Ties That Bind, The